Kovarditsy is a rural locality (a selo) and the administrative center of Kovarditskoye Rural Settlement, Muromsky District, Vladimir Oblast, Russia. The population was 1,504 as of 2010. There are 35 streets.

Geography 
Kovarditsy is located 8 km northwest of Murom (the district's administrative centre) by road. Nezhilovka is the nearest rural locality.

References 

Rural localities in Muromsky District
Muromsky Uyezd